Ministry of Information and Communications is the government ministry in Vietnam. It is responsible for administration and regulation of newspapers, publishing, the postal service, telecommunications, internet, broadcasting, radio and radio frequency, information technology, electronics, television and national media infrastructure.

Ministerial units
 Department of Posts
 Department of Science and Technology
 Department of Planning and Finance
 Department of International Cooperation
 Department of Legal Affairs
 Department of Personnel and Organisation
 Ministry Inspectorate
 Ministry Office
 Bureau of Radio Frequency Management
 Bureau of Telecommunications
 Bureau of National Digital Transformation
 Bureau of Press
 Bureau of Publication, Printing and Distribution
 Authority of Broadcasting and Electronic Information
 Bureau of Foreign Information Service
 Bureau of Basic Information Service
 Bureau of Information and Communications Technology Industry
 Representative Office of the Ministry in Ho Chi Minh City
 Representative Office of the Ministry in Da Nang City

Administrative units
    National Institute of Information and Communications Strategy
    Vietnam Internet Network Information Centre (VNNIC)
    Information Centre
    Information and Communications Journal
    Centre for Press and International Communications Cooperation
    Information and Communications Public Management School
    Vietnam Institute of Software and Digital Content Industry (NISCI)
    Information and Communications Publishing House
    Vietnam Cybersecurity Emergency Response Teams/Coordination Center (VNCERT/CC)
    Vietnam Public Utility Telecommunications Service Fund
    Vietnam- Korean Friendship Information Technology College
    Printing Technology College
    VietnamNet Newspaper
    Office of National Steering Committee on Information and Communication Technology
    Vietnam ICT Project Management Unit
    Posts and Telecommunications Institute of Technology (PTIT)

External links
 Official site

Information and Communications
Governmental office in Hanoi
Vietnam, Information and Communications
Vietnam